Daisuke Yoshioka (born 6 January 1980) is a Japanese alpine skier. He competed in the men's giant slalom at the 2006 Winter Olympics. He was ranked 24th in the Giant Slalom event.

References

1980 births
Living people
Japanese male alpine skiers
Olympic alpine skiers of Japan
Alpine skiers at the 2006 Winter Olympics
Sportspeople from Hokkaido
21st-century Japanese people